Saint-Thurien is a former commune in the Eure department in Normandy in northern France. On 1 January 2019, it was merged into the new commune Le Perrey.

It took its name from Saint Turiaf of Dol, bishop of the ancient Diocese of Dol.

Population

See also
Communes of the Eure department

References

Former communes of Eure